Improbable describes something that has a low probability.  It may also refer to

 Improbable (company), a British company founded in 2012
 Improbable (novel), a 2005 science fiction thriller novel by Adam Fawer
 Improbable (The X-Files), an episode in the ninth season of the science fiction television series
 Improbable (horse), a racehorse
 Improbable (theatre company), an English theatre company

See also 

 Probability (disambiguation)
 Probably  (disambiguation)